The Regional Council of Centre-Val de Loire (French: conseil régional du Centre-Val de Loire) is a deliberative assembly composed of 77 councillors, elected to six-year terms. As a whole, the body represents the region of Centre-Val de Loire, France. The current president of the council is François Bonneau of the Socialist Party (PS). A position he has held since 7 September 2007 and the resignation of fellow party member Michel Sapin. The regional council meets at the hôtel de région in Orléans, Loiret department. The building is located at 9, rue Saint-Pierre Lentin.

Composition

Allocation of seats 
Council seats are allocated by department, as follows:

19 councillors for Loiret
 18 councillors for Indre-et-Loire
 12 councillors for Eure-et-Loir
 10 councillors for Cher
 10 councillors for Loir-et-Cher
 8 councillors for Indre

Political groups 
The current council is composed of six political groups:

 The Socialists, radicals, citizens (PS - PRG) (24)
 The Union of the right, the centre and the independents (LR - UDI) (13) 
 The National Rally and allies (RN) (13)
 Ecology and solidarity (EÉLV - FI) (12)
 Center, Democrat, Republican and Citizen (MoDem - REM) (9)
 Communist and republican (PCF) (6)

Executive

Presidents 
The current council president is François Bonneau of the Socialist Party (PS), first elected to the position in 2007.

Vice-presidents 
Currently, the regional council executive is also composed of 13 vice presidents.

References 

Centre-Val_de_Loire
Politics of Centre-Val de Loire